Being after Rousseau: Philosophy and Culture in Question is a book by Richard Velkley, in which the author offers an assessment of the position of Jean-Jacques Rousseau's thought within modern philosophy.

References

External links 
 Being after Rousseau: Philosophy and Culture in Question

2002 non-fiction books
Books about Immanuel Kant
Books by Richard Velkley
English-language books
University of Chicago Press books
Works about Friedrich Wilhelm Joseph Schelling
Works about Jean-Jacques Rousseau
Works about Martin Heidegger